The Ministry of Statistics and Programme Implementation (MoSPI) is a ministry of Government of India concerned with coverage and quality aspects of statistics released. The surveys conducted by the Ministry are based on scientific sampling methods.

History

The Ministry of Statistics and Programme Implementation (MOSPI) came into existence as an Independent Ministry on 15 October 1999 after the merger of the Department of Statistics and the Department of Programme Implementation.

Departments

The Ministry has two wings, one relating to Statistics and the other Programme Implementation. The Statistics Wing called the National Statistical Office (NSO) consists of the Central Statistical Office (CSO), the Computer center and the National Sample Survey Office (NSSO). The Programme Implementation Wing has three Divisions, namely, (i) Twenty Point Programme (ii) Infrastructure Monitoring and Project Monitoring and (iii) Member of Parliament Local Area Development Scheme. Besides these two wings, there is National Statistical Commission created through a Resolution of Government of India (MOSPI) and one autonomous Institute, viz., Indian Statistical Institute declared as an institute of National importance by an Act of Parliament.

The Ministry of Statistics and Programme Implementation attaches considerable importance to coverage and quality aspects of statistics released in the country. The statistics released are based on administrative sources, surveys and censuses conducted by the center and State Governments and non-official sources and studies. The surveys conducted by the Ministry are based on scientific sampling methods. Field data are collected through dedicated field staff. In line with the emphasis on the quality of statistics released by the Ministry, the methodological issues concerning the compilation of national accounts are overseen Committees like Advisory Committee on National Accounts, Standing Committee on Industrial Statistics, Technical Advisory Committee on Price Indices. The Ministry compiles data sets based on current data, after applying standard statistical techniques and extensive scrutiny and supervision.

Responsibilities
National Statistical Office (NSO) is mandated with the following responsibilities:

 acts as the nodal agency for planned development of the statistical system in the country, lays down and maintains norms and standards in the field of statistics, involving concepts and definitions, methodology of data collection, processing of data and dissemination of results;
 coordinates the statistical work in respect of the Ministries/Departments of the Government of India and State Statistical Bureaus (SSBs), advises the Ministries/Departments of the Government of India on statistical methodology and on statistical analysis of data;
 prepares national accounts as well as publishes annual estimates of national product, government and private consumption expenditure, capital formation, savings, estimates of capital stock and consumption of fixed capital, as also the state level gross capital formation of supra-regional sectors and prepares comparable estimates of State Domestic Product (SDP) at current prices;
 maintains liaison with international statistical organizations, such as, the United Nations Statistical Division (UNSD), the Economic and Social Commission for Asia and the Pacific (ESCAP), the Statistical Institute for Asia and the Pacific (SIAP), the International Monetary Fund (IMF), the Asian Development Bank (ADB), the Food and Agriculture Organizations (FAO), the International Labour Organizations (ILO), etc.
 compiles and releases the Index of Industrial Production (IIP) every month in the form of ‘quick estimates’; conducts the Annual Survey of Industries (ASI); and provides statistical information to assess and evaluate the changes in the growth, composition and structure of the organized manufacturing sector;
 organizes and conducts periodic all-India Economic Censuses and follow-up enterprise surveys, provides an in-house facility to process the data collected through various socio economic surveys and follow-up enterprise surveys of Economic Censuses;
 conducts large scale all-India sample surveys for creating the database needed for studying the impact of specific problems for the benefit of different population groups in diverse socio economic areas, such as employment, consumer expenditure, housing conditions and environment, literacy levels, health, nutrition, family welfare, etc.;
 examines the survey reports from the technical angle and evaluates the sampling design including survey feasibility studies in respect of surveys conducted by the National Sample Survey Organizations and other Central Ministries and Departments;
 dissemination of statistical information on various aspects through a number of publications distributed to Government, semi-Government, or private data users/ agencies; and disseminates data, on request, to the United Nations agencies like the UNSD, the ESCAP, the ILO and other international agencies;
 releases grants-in-aid to registered Non-Governmental Organizations and research institutions of repute for undertaking special studies or surveys, printing of statistical reports, and financing seminars, workshops and conferences relating to different subject areas of official statistics;

Programme Implementation Wing responsibilities

 Monitoring of the Twenty Point Programme (TPP)'''
 Monitoring the performance of the country's 11 key infrastructure sectors, viz., Power, Coal, Steel, Railways, Telecommunications, Ports, Fertilizers, Cement, Petroleum & Natural Gas, Roads and Civil Aviation (IPMD);
 Monitoring of all Central Sector Projects costing Rs. 150 crore and above (IPMD); and
 Monitoring the implementation of Members of Parliament Local Area Development Scheme (MPLADS).

Administration Division

Functions as the Cadre Controlling Authority to manage the Indian Statistical Service and Subordinate Statistical Service including matters like training, career and manpower planning; and acts as the nodal Ministry for the Indian Statistical Institute and ensures its functioning in accordance with the provisions of the Indian Statistical Institute Act, 1959 (57 of 1959).

Plans
The Ministry is looking at allotting a 16-digit Business identification number to each business establishment. Apart from helping the government create and maintain a comprehensive database on businesses, the unique number will also simplify a business' dealings with various governmental agencies by reducing chances of duplicate entities, resolving identity issues and saving time when going for future registrations or licences.

List of  Ministers

List of Ministers of State

References

External links
 Official Website

1999 establishments in India
Government agencies established in 1999
Statistics and Programme Implementation
Statistical organisations in India